{{DISPLAYTITLE:C7H10N2O2S}}
The molecular formula C7H10N2O2S may refer to:

Carbimazole, drug used to treat hyperthyroidism
Mafenide, a sulfonamide-type medication used as an antibiotic